The Junta de Defensa Nacional was a military junta which governed the territories held by the Nationalist faction of the Spanish Civil War from July to September 1936. The junta's president was Miguel Cabanellas and its head of state was Francisco Franco. The junta was dissolved when Franco was proclaimed caudillo of Spain.

History 

On 18 July 1936, right-wing military officers staged a coup against the Second Spanish Republic, however, the coup failed and began the Spanish Civil War. On 25 July, the leaders of the Nationalist faction, which instigated the attempted coup, declared the establishment of the National Defense Junta.

The junta held a meeting on 21 November to resolve disputed within the Nationalist faction on who their ultimate leader will be. Several of the junta's leaders, including President Miguel Cabanellas, Head of State Francisco Franco, Emilio Mola, Gonzalo Queipo de Llano, attended the meeting and were all candidates to become the faction's sole leader. Additionally, Nicolás Franco, José Millán-Astray, Luis Bolín, and José Antonio Sangróniz were in attendance to support Franco's bid to become the sole leader of the Nationalists. Eventually, Franco was proclaimed as the supreme caudillo of Spain by Decree Number 138 (es) on 30 September 1936 and the National Defense Junta was dissolved. Cabanillas opposed Franco's rise as the Nationalists' sole leader, telling his fellow generals, "if you give him [Franco] Spain, he is going to believe that it is his and he will not allow anyone to replace him in the war or after it, until his death." The National Defense Junta was replaced by the Technical Junta of the State.

See also 

 National Defense Council
 Junta Técnica del Estado

References

Citations

Bibliography

External links 

  Decree Number 138

1936 establishments in Spain
1936 disestablishments in Spain
Anti-communism in Spain
Far-right politics
Fascism in Spain
Organisations of the Spanish Civil War